Krasnokholmsky (masculine), Krasnokholmskaya (feminine), or Krasnokholmskoye (neuter) may refer to:
Krasnokholmsky District, a district of Tver Oblast, Russia
Krasnokholmsky (rural locality), a rural locality (a selo) in the Republic of Bashkortostan, Russia
Krasnokholmskoye, a rural locality (a settlement) in Kaliningrad Oblast, Russia